The 1996 Ole Miss Rebels football team represented the University of Mississippi during the 1996 NCAA Division I-A football season.  They participated as members of the Southeastern Conference in the West Division.  Coached by Tommy Tuberville, the Rebels played their home games at Vaught–Hemingway Stadium in Oxford, Mississippi.

The 1996 Rebels served the second of a two-year postseason bowl ban, part of the sanctions handed down by the NCAA in November 1994. Ole Miss was allowed to appear on television after the NCAA banned the Rebels from the tube in 1995.

Schedule

References

Ole Miss
Ole Miss Rebels football seasons
Ole Miss Rebels football